Pennydale is a neighbourhood in the suburb of Cheltenham in Melbourne, Victoria, Australia, approximately 19 km south-east of the Melbourne central business district. Pennydale is that part of Cheltenham lying between Bay Road to the north, Jack Road to the west, Park Road to the south, and the Frankston railway line, and is entirely within the local government area of the City of Bayside.

To the north-east of Pennydale, on the opposite side of the railway line and within Cheltenham, is the Westfield Southland shopping centre, which was opened in 1968. It has been expanded in a number of stages over the years, including a bridge, containing shops, across the Nepean Highway.

History - Edwin Thomas Penny
The name Pennydale began its use in the early part of the 20th Century due to the joining of the name of the prominent family living on the site – the Penny family – and the name "dale" being an old English word meaning "valley". The Penny family – and Edwin Thomas Penny specifically, were so highly regarded in the community that they began calling the area Pennydale as a sign of endearment since the land itself used by the family for fruit and vegetable growing sat in a large valley from Tulip Grove being the highest land in the area, towards the bay. The name became used by family and friends as well as other local residents who moved into the area both during ET Penny's life, but more-so after he had passed away suddenly on 9 December 1916 aged just 67. A newspaper article in the Oakleigh Leader 27 October 1894 page 5 on Penny and his orchards stated about Cheltenham that "the township, by the way, is named after the well known watering place in England, and is sheltered by hills the same as in the old country." This then is the genesis of the Dale section of the name. (Oakleigh Leader 27 Oct 1894 page 5).

The name Pennydale was introduced officially when a post office was established in the Bay Road East shopping centre on 3 March 1956. The Post office – located at 360 Bay Road - was opened by the Post Master General as a means of avoiding confusion in deliveries between the Cheltenham and the Highett Post Offices. The official postal address at that time was "Pennydale S22". When the system changed to using Post Codes, Pennydale used the same Post Code as Cheltenham being 3192. On 27 October 1993 the Post Office became a Licensed Post Office and it ran as such until it closed down on 25 August 1999. The reason for the closure was that a new post office had opened within the Southland Shopping Centre and it was deemed that the Pennydale Post Office was no longer required. Following the closure of the post office, many residents have continued using the name since that time, and letters addressed to Pennydale 3192 are still being delivered even today.

As stated, the name Pennydale was chosen in the 1950s to avoid confusion with post offices in Highett and Cheltenham. It was proposed by Cr Everest A Le Page (Moorabbin City Council) that the new post office be named in recognition of the contribution of Edwin Thomas Penny, a man that had been a friend of both his Father and his Grandfather in the district as it opened up as well as a fellow Councillor and Mayor of the Shire. This nomination was made following a request from the Post Master Generals Office for the council to suggest a suitable name. Cr Le Page also noted that Edwin Penny had primarily been responsible for the South African Boer War Memorial in Cheltenham. A member of the Penny Family is listed as a returned soldier on that monument (L W 4 Penny). The memorial was placed on the corner of Charman Road and the Point Nepean Road and originally was built with 2 wonderful lamps and a drinking fountain. The Moorabbin Council surveyed residents in the area, who agreed with the name Pennydale as many residents already used that name at the time anyway.

In 2006, Bayside Council began the process of formally naming all unnamed parks in the Bayside Municipality. The park in Olympic Avenue beside the Kindergarten had been there since the early days and Council asked residents to come up with a name for the park. A number of suggestions were put forward to Council who looked at each one and in the end agreed to name the park Pennydale Park following a higher number of votes for that name and because that names was already unofficially in use by sections of the community already. The park was officially named Pennydale Park and Bayside Council erected a park sign facing Olympic Avenue stating "In 1958 the postal area between Park Road and Bay Road was named 'Pennydale', in recognition of the Penny family who settled in the area in 1862.". This sign is still in place and is a recognition not only of the name Pennydale, but of the Penny family and their long history with the area. Bayside Council registered the name with VICNAMES – The Register of Geographic Names Victorian State Government - Registered Place Name ID VIC100049, and in 2015 it went further and registered the reason for the name as printed on the park sign so that there was a registration of the Pennydale name.

It was with this history in mind that the Pennydale Residents Action Group was formed and the process to officially change the name to Pennydale begun.

The name 'Pennydale' recognises the contribution of the Penny family who have lived in the area since the 1850s, and in particular recognises the contribution of local identity Edwin Thomas (ET) Penny (1849 – 1916), who was a Moorabbin Shire Councillor from 1893 to 1908, and President of the Shire of Moorabbin from 1898 to 1900).

Thomas Millard Penny (1821 – 1866), the father of Edwin Thomas Penny, took up 10 acres of land for farming in Bay Road Cheltenham in 1853 soon after arriving in the district and making a home in Charman Road. In 1862 Thomas Penny reserved a further 3 acres of the land on Bay road (later mentioned as Jack road) for an orchard, and the balance for vegetable cultivation. His son Edwin Thomas (ET) Penny focused more on fruit growing adopting a 'scientific approach'. He grew apples, pears, peaches and plums, as well and trialing innovative fruits including persimmon, passionfruit and gooseberry. A newspaper article from the era states that 'Cr Edwin Penny is a gardener and orchardist of the new school ...he has broken away from the old groove.' Edwin Penny was one of over 120 witnesses who presented information at the 1915 Royal Commission on Fruit, Vegetables and Jam. The report on that Commission notes that Edwin Penny was a fruit grower and market gardener with around 25 acres, including 20 acres of orchards and vegetables grown between the trees. ET Penny was a prominent figure in many local institutions, as well as being on the directorate of the Market Gardeners' Association. (Oakleigh Leader, Saturday 27 October 1894) (Brighton Southern Cross, Saturday 28 March 1908) (Article 225 Rate Book Extract for Road District of Moorabbin 1862 City of Kingston Historical Website) (Victoria Royal Commission on Fruit, Vegetables and Jam, Minutes of Evidence, 1915, page 179).  (Obituary for Edwin Thomas Penny, Brighton Southern Cross Sat 16 Dec 1916)

Edwin Thomas Penny was elected to the Moorabbin Shire Council in 1893 serving as the Mayor from 1898 to 1900. Upon his election to Mayor, the Brighton Southern Cross mentioned that "In the 5 years since his election to Council he has always taken a leading part in its deliberations and is devoted to the best interests to the ratepayers of the riding." The article went on to say that Penny "was a valued member of the local Board of Advice, he has always been prominent in matters relating to the welfare of rising generation of Moorabbinites". It goes on to say that Penny "has devoted time and attention to the formation of the new Cheltenham recreation ground being a committee member. He has always been in immediate touch with any movement bought forward for the advancement of the district and is very popular with both young and old." On 7 August 1905 Councillor Penny addressed an audience at the Mechanics institute whilst seeking re-election for a further 3 years. He told the congregation that in the past 12 years he had only missed 4 of the 300 meetings and had kept his promise to do his best for the Riding and the Shire. Penny was re-elected for a further 3 years. Penny served on Council for 15 years in total, losing the last election by a mere 26 votes.  ET Penny's contribution to the Shire as a Councillor was acknowledged at a large gathering held at the Mechanics' Institute Mordialloc, in November 1908. The event was held 'for the purpose of showing their recognition of the valuable services rendered by ex-Cr. Penny during his 15 years representation of the South Riding of the Shire of Moorabbin'. It was recorded that Penny was 'one of the best known men in Moorabbin', and 'had taken a leading part in its growth as a producing centre, and in its public, church and social life'. It was further recorded that 'his property reportedly had frontages to Tulip, Jack and Bay Roads'. Edwin Penny was presented with a ring and his wife with an epergne. In his reply Edwin Penny noted that 'he had lived in the shire for 54 years and had watched it grow from a wilderness to the beauty spot of Victoria'. (Brighton Southern Cross 17 September 1898 page 2) (Brighton Southern Cross 12 August 1905 page 2). (Brighton Southern Cross, Saturday 7 November 1908, page 4)

In 1889 ET Penny was a co-founder of the Cheltenham Rifle Club along with Frank LePage and others. At various times he was the President and he continued to be a member of the club until his death in 1916. The Cheltenham Rifle club operated out of Cheltenham Park where a rifle range was set up and continued until the area began to really settle. The rifle club continued operations at both Cheltenham Park and then at Langwarrin at least until the 1930s when both the districts began to be built on. (LePage Article Ref 201 – Kingston Historical Website)(Victorian Municipal Directory 1933)(Graham Whitehead, Article 390 City of Kingston Historical Website)

ET Penny was also one of the Directors of the Cheltenham Creamery and Butter Factory which operated between 1895 and 1905. The Factory marketed a brand of butter known as "Gilt Edge", well known at that time throughout the entire state. Penny was one of the original committee and when land was found and the Creamery preparing to get underway, a company was formed to run the Creamery with Penny, Allnutt and Wilson elected as Directors of the company. The cutting of the butter into one pound pats was not easy until one of the chaps invented the first butter cutter, a series of wires which became known as the 'Invicta Butter Cutter'. (Whitehead, G. J. The Cheltenham Creamery and Butter Factory, Article Ref. 259, City of Kingston Historical Website)(Everest LePage, Article 201, City of Kingston Historical Website) (Caulfield and Elsternwick Leader 26 January 1895 page 5)(Tom M. Farmilo, Senior Horticultural Adviser – Vegetables (first published in the "Victorian Vegetable Growers' Digest",summer, 1970 now available on the Ausvegvic.com.au website)

ET Penny was a Chairman of the Moorabbin Board of Advice for State School in Cheltenham, Moorabbin, Mentone, Heatherton and Mordialloc amongst others after being duly elected by the ratepayers residing in the school district for a period of 3 years from 1899 to 1901. The Board of Advice was a forerunner to today's School Councils. School Advice Boards were abolished in 1910 and replaced by School Committees that became School Councils.  On 9 May 1901 Penny, together with the Reverend Alfred Caffin, attended the opening of the Commonwealth Parliament at the Melbourne Exhibition Buildings, the Duke and Duchess of Cornwall and York and their son Edward presided over the opening. Councillor Penny attended the event and took a "Prominent Part" in the welcome to the Duke and Duchess. As part of his position as chairman of the Board of Advice for the district, Penny attended with students from the local schools who took part in tableaus and displays in the forecourts of the Exhibition Buildings. A few days earlier, an afternoon assembly was held at Cheltenham State School hoisting the Union Jack onto a brand new Flagpole (still in place) and "The Grand Old Flag" was sung before Councillor Penny and others made speeches to the assembled students and faculty. On 14 May a coordinated flag raising ceremony was held at each of the district state schools and the flag was saluted. At Cheltenham State School, the Moorabbin Brass Band accompanied the singing of the National Anthem and the Cheltenham Rifle club provided a 21 gun salute followed by Councillor Penny who addressed the children on their duties to the flag and Empire then distributed to the teachers and scholars the Commonwealth medals struck by the Government for the Occasion that were handed out to all students. (Brighton Southern Cross (Vic. : 1896 – 1918), Saturday 4 May 1901, page 2) (Graham Whitehead – Reference 100 City of Kingston Historical Website) (Brighton Southern Cross (Vic. : 1896 – 1918), Saturday 18 May 1901, page 2) (Education Act 1872 Act number 447) (Author Deborah Tout-Smith – https://collections.museumsvictoria.com.au/articles/1933) (Graham Whitehead – Ref 100 City of Kingston Historical Website) (Caulfield and Elsternwick Leader 11 February 1899 page 2)

In April 1901 ET Penny was inducted as a Justice of the Peace and served on the bench at the Cheltenham Court until his death in 1916. Being a Justice of the Peace was equivalent to being a Magistrate today. ET Penny sat on the bench with a number of other well-known people from the region. He heard many cases over his years serving including fining people for public drunkenness, failure to pay rates, wilful assault, failure to immunise children, failure to send children to school and even Murder. ET Penny was a man for the people and he treated everybody with respect and dignity. On 18 August 1887 a meeting was held at the Cheltenham Protestant hall to discuss the situation causing concern in the region – that being a large influx of Chinese into Victoria. The concern arose due to the Chinese taking on labour jobs at lower wages that other locals who missed out on the work and income. The Victorian Colonial Government saw what was happening and passed a law in 1855 to try to stem this tide but it failed and many Chinese came to the Victorian goldfields to find their wealth. After the gold began to get harder to find, many Chinese sought jobs throughout the metropolitan regions including the Cheltenham area. Whilst the tone of the meeting was protection of lands and wages, there was some who were simply looking at blaming the Chinese immigrants for their lot in life and began to spout anti-Chinese sentiment. ET Penny spoke up in support of the Chinese at the Cheltenham meeting while recognizing their numbers were likely to increase stating "They must not be ill-treated and we must look after them. When they lease our soil they have as much right to it as anyone else and the law must protect them. There were good Chinese and he would sooner trust them with £5 than many Europeans." Penny went on to say that if the community was to succeed
people must be content to sacrifice a little at present for the good of the future and the welfare of the children. (Graham Whitehead. Article 322 City of Kingston Historical Website) (Brighton Southern Cross, 27 August 1887)

ET Penny was involved in the establishment of Cheltenham's first cricket ground. The first ground was on land just behind the Eastern side of Charman Road but it was clear that pressures to build would mean this would be lost. A committee was setup including Penny to lobby for land to build a new Cricket Ground and football Ground and in 1894 this occurred on Weatherall Road, a ground that is still there and in use for the same purposes today. (Graham Whitehead Article 273, 289 & 390 City of Kingston Historical Website)

ET Penny was involved in the life of the Cheltenham Church of Christ for the period of time he lived in the area, helping to get the Cheltenham Church of Christ built in the first place in 1887. He regularly took and ran the Sunday School program as the Superintendent and at times when the pastor was away, Penny ran the Sunday services in place of the Pastor as the Preacher which he did regularly, sometimes for weeks or months at a time. In 1920, 4 years after his death, a new hall was constructed for the Kindergarten and named the "E.T. Penny Memorial" in recognition of his service to the Church including signal service for the Church and Brotherhood, especially in Youth Services. (80th Anniversary Souvenir History of the Church of Christ Cheltenham Victoria)(Brighton Southern Cross 11 August 1900 page 2) (Moorabbin News 10 Jan 1914 page 1)

Penny was one of the founding members of the local division of the Sons of Temperance group (Star of Moorabbin Division No29.), a friendly society aimed to assist members and their families at times of unemployment, illness and death. He served in many roles in the group including starting off as Assistant Conductor but also taking on the roles of Worthy Patriarch, Recording Scribe and Conductor. The Sons of Temperance was absorbed into the Independent Order of Oddfellows (IOOF) which subsequently became part of NIB Health Funds. Whilst unable to drink alcohol as a member of the Temperance Society, Penny did actually get in trouble once for doing so. Whilst not a drinker, Penny and his family regularly attended the Exchange Hotel (now the Tudor inn) on the Point Nepean Road for meals and meetings, creating a pathway through the area. When the railway line was built in 1881, the Penny's kept using the same pathways, creating a crossing over the line at what is now Heather Grove. When Vic Rail formalised all crossings in the 1950s, this crossing point was retained as it had grown in usage thanks largely to the walking habits of the Penny family (Graham Whitehead. Article 647 City of Kingston Historical Website) (Penny family history)

Penny contributed to the operations of many community groups including The Melbourne Benevolent Asylum, The Cheltenham Mechanics Institute and The Moorabbin Rural Industries Association. In 1880 when it became obvious that the Victorian Benevolent Society property in North Melbourne was in need of replacement, the State Premier agreed in 1890 to grant land of 150 acres in Cheltenham to move the asylum to. In 1905 as a Councillor of the Shire, and a good Christian, Penny led the drive to get the project moving. Penny was involved in the Moorabbin Horticultural, Poultry and Dog Society for many years including serving as its vice president and President. Penny one of those responsible for the inauguration of the Society on 26 October 1898 in which he was elected as a vice president. Penny was also one of those committee members who drafted the rules and constitution for the club. On 24 July 1907, a deputation from the Horticultural Society including Penny met with the Minister of Agriculture asking for the establishment of a plot of land to use as an Experimental farm for growing of vegetables. It was agreed to set up a farm to grow produce used for scenting (perfumes etc.). In February 1909 the Horticultural society met to congratulate the fact the Scent farm was up and running and experts from the Department of Agriculture were present to talk to the market gardeners about the project. (Caulfield and Elsternwick Leader 29 Oct 1898 page 3)(Oakleigh Leader 29 April 1899 page 2)(Brighton Southern Cross 14 Mar 1903 page 3)(The Age 22 Feb 1904 page 9)(The Age 25 July 1907 page 9)(The Australasian 14 Mar 1908 page 12)(Brighton Southern Cross 20 Feb 1909 page 6)(Melbourne Leader – Kennel notes 11 November 1911 page 14)(Moorabbin News 18 July 1914 page 5)(Seaside News 26 July 1916 page 4)(Seaside News 18 November 1916 page 4)(The Age 11 December 1916 page 8)

In 1910, after many years of squabbling and infighting about the ownership and state of the Brighton Sea baths, the State Government bought the baths and leased it out to Edwin Penny for a period of 21 years for a rate of 10 Pounds per year and the understanding that Penny would rebuild the baths essentially making it a new structure at a cost of between 1200 and 1300 Pounds. The new building was an imposing structure and Penny had lengthened the sea wall to permit deep sea bathing, erected a large concert hall and provision had been made for hot sea water baths. Following his death in 1916, the Penny family connection to the baths continued through the generations. Clifford Frederick Penny (1885 – 1924), one of Edwin Thomas and Sarah Ann Penny's youngest son married Ethel Annie Carter at the family home in Jack Road Cheltenham in 1910. They started married life as proprietors of the newly renovated Brighton Beach Sea Baths, originally built in 1867. Clifford died on his 39th birthday leaving a wife and 3 young children. Ethel managed to continue running the 'Penny' Baths as they were known for another 3 years and was the owner of property in Churchill Avenue, Cheltenham. The Brighton Council took over the running of the baths in 1928. (Penny, E. 1996. Reflections. As told by Ernie Penny to his daughter Brenda Kennedy) (Graham Whitehead Article 660 City of Kingston Historical Website) (The Argus 7 May 1910 page 21.) (The Age 29 November 1910.)

On 9 December 1916 Penny was working on his property in the morning but when in the afternoon he felt ill and took a rest on his veranda. Shortly afterwards he had a violent vomiting attack and the doctor was called. After a short period of stabilisation, Penny died soon after. The official reports were that the death was caused by Shock, Cardiac syncope (fainting due to low blood pressure) and internal ruptures. The sad news of Penny's passing swept far and wide and was reported in the local area, the region and even interstate. Edwin Penny was buried at Cheltenham Cemetery on Monday 11 December 1916 after a brief service at his beloved Church of Christ where he was due to preach the day following his death. The service at the graveside was curtailed due to foul weather but regardless was very largely attended. A memorial service was subsequently held at the Church. The pall bearers for the coffin was a who's who of the region with names such as Allnutt, LePage, Laver, Brownfield, Butler, Marriott and Davie and the Coffin Bearers were Wolf, Barnett, Daff, Hayes, Simpson and Bodsworth. Edwin Penny was interred with his first wife Sarah Ann and their second son Percival Thomas and later in 1937 his second wife Emily Maria was also interred with them. They can be found at the Cheltenham Memorial Cemetery in the Church of Christ Section of the Cemetery in Section A Grave 72.

Edwin Penny's obituaries said a lot about the man and his standing in the community. It was said that he was a "prominent figure in many local institutions as well as being on the Directorate of the Market Gardener’s Association." Another newspaper stated that he was "also of the committee of the Melbourne Benevolent Asylum, Horticultural Society and many smaller local bodies" and that he "took an active part in Church and Temperance work and was announced to preach yesterday in the pulpit of the Church of Christ of which he was one of the Founders." At the following Council meeting on Monday 18 December the President Councillor W. Kelly said of Penny "that for all the years he knew Penny he always found him to be a strictly honest, upright and honourable man.", going on to say that "like the late Councillor Burgess, God had sent him specially to the district to be an example to the people to follow." He went on to say that Penny was a "generous man, always ready to give advice and assistance in anything that was going on." He further states that "whilst in the Council he performed very good work. He was a good Churchman but was not what one might call a wowser." Kelly moved a motion that a letter of sympathy be forwarded to Penny's widow and family. Councillor LePage seconded the motion and said "that during the years Penny occupied a
seat at the Council table he did his duty honestly and fearlessly." The motion was carried in silence. The Moorabbin News reported Penny's death by stating that "he had lived in the district nearly his entire life" and that "To say that he was respected and esteemed is insufficient, he was beloved by a whole circle of friends and relatives and was the honoured confidant of many peoples troubles and difficulties". It went on to say that "he invariably assisted all deserving cases, was generous giver to all public appeals and innumerable private ones" and then finishes off by stating that "in fact, it will
be only by his death that one will be able to realise the extent of his usefulness.". The article goes on to say that Penny took a prominent part in all Church and Temperance work and that not only had he been associated with the Church of Christ for the whole of his life but that he "occupied the pulpit not only occasional, but for weeks and months at a time when the Church was without a resident preacher." The author goes on to state that Penny was "connected with local societies far too numerous to mention" and that "his guidance was sought by many and refused by none." Yet another local newspaper said of Penny's passing "The Moorabbin District has lost another of its leading residents." At its Annual meeting in January 1917, the Cheltenham Mechanics Institute showed its sorrow at the loss of its president and long standing member Penny, and a resolution was
adopted placing on the records of the Institute "the appreciation of the subscribers of the good work done by Penny during his long connection with the Institute." (Sandringham Southern Cross 16 December 1916 page 5)(The Age 11 December 1916 page 8)(Brighton Southern Cross 16 December 1916 page 5)(Brighton Southern Cross 23 December 1916 page 2)(Moorabbin News 16 December 1916 page 4)(Seaside News 13 January 1917 page 4)(Weekly Times 16 December 1916 page 24)

The Pennydale Residents Action Group
The Pennydale Residents Action Group (PRAG) was formed in March 2017, in response to concerns about the proposed Structure Plan developed by Bayside Council. Those concerns included the use of the term "Southland Structure Plan". Many residents felt that the reference to Southland created an inappropriate expectation, treating a residential area, with narrow streets unsuited to medium and high density development, as a potential commercial hub.
 
PRAG is supported by a broad base of volunteers, and an online social media group with more than 540 members. Community discussion via social media resolved to reclaim the name Pennydale, which had been applied to the locality since the second half of the 20th century. The aim was to draw attention to the distinctive neighbourhood character and to seek to retain it. Proponents felt that changing the name of the suburb to Pennydale would give that section of Bayside a unique identity which residents could feel proud of.

PRAG continues to advocate on behalf of the Pennydale community via constant interaction with bodies such as Bayside Council, Kingston Council, The Level Crossing Removal Project (LXRP), Vic Roads and others. Through its ongoing relationships, it has helped work towards changes throughout the Pennydale area including a new footpath in Charlton Avenue, paving of the Erskine Avenue Laneway in conjunction with the local residents, upgrading of the facilities at Pennydale Park including fencing, shade-clothes and other changes, the installation of a Children's Crossing on Park Road near the railway line to assist students crossing the road to Cheltenham Primary School, Objections to inappropriate developments, protection of trees on both Council and private property, plus ongoing liaison with the LXRP through two of its members on the Community Reference Group to assist in making the level crossing removal process less of a burden to the community, plus other things as well.

PRAG is also involved in other direct items in the Pennydale community including annual Christmas Sausage Sizzle get-together, Neighbourhood Watch (NHW) Pennydale, graffiti-busting activities and more. Throughout the COVID-19 Pandemic PRAG has arranged or taken part in multiple activities to help get through the lockdown including Barry the Gnome on the Roam roving garden gnome, Bin Isolation outings, Teddy Bears hunt in windows, Trivia nights, Isolation Movie club and more.

PRAG is in constant contact with Bayside Council regarding issues pertaining to the Pennydale Neighbourhood. PRAG reports to the residents via the Pennydale Community Facebook page, via an email group, and when necessary via local flyer delivery direct to all letterboxes throughout Pennydale.

PRAG operates the community Facebook page Pennydale Community which is a closed group only for members of the Pennydale community to use with membership strictly allowed only for those who live in Pennydale. This page is used for members to discuss things pertaining to Pennydale without external pressures. As at February 2023 the page has a membership of 923.

The Pennydale Petition - Name Change Process
After discussions with council staff, it was decided to formally seek the approval of residents for an official change the name of the area from Cheltenham to Pennydale. PRAG distributed a petition, which ran from 29 May to 19 June 2017, to every household in the relevant area. More than 61% agreed to the name change, with fewer than 4% either being against it or declining to take part. Given the support of the community, PRAG lodged the required documents with Bayside Council on 20 June 2017. At a council meeting on 27 June, the petition was formally tabled. It was unanimously agreed that the name of the proposed Structure Plan would be amended from "Southland Structure Plan" to "Southland / Pennydale Structure Plan". On 25 July, council officers recommended to the council that work be done to see if the name change was feasible, including a check with the Office of Geographic Names. Council voted unanimously to proceed, noting that the process could take up to a year.

On 9 November 2017, Council began sending ballots to all relevant residents and property owners, asking whether they approved of the name change. The ballot paper required voters to mark a "Yes" or a "No" box, and to say why they had made that decision. The two-month voting period closed on 8 January 2018. There was criticism of the material sent out by Bayside Council because it had excluded residences on the west side of Jack Road from the proposed Pennydale area, despite the original Pennydale petition including them. Council eventually agreed to allow residents on the west side of Jack road to collect a separate petition. After it had been signed by the appropriate number of people as determined by Council, those residents were hand-delivered their ballots, and given until 12 February 2018 to vote.

At the 22 March council meeting, it was revealed 51% of residents had voted, and that 85% of those in the "main" part of Pennydale, and 67% of those west Jack Road, had voted for the name change. The total "yes" vote was 523 and the total "no" vote was 101. Councillors voted unanimously to allow the name change to proceed and agreed to send a request to the Office of Geographic Names (OGN) to effect the name change.
On 19 July 2018, Bayside Council received a letter from the Registrar of Geographic Names, Craig Sandy, advising that with the information supplied to them at this time, the OGN could not support the name change to Pennydale, advising that Council resubmit the proposal with further explanatory information that was not present in the initial set of documentation. The OGN advised that this was not an abnormal set of circumstances to occur and was expected due to Council's first name change request like this. It noted that with the information it did have from the initial documentation, Council could request an addition of Pennydale as a locality name (still to be called Pennydale and still using the same postcode 3192), or it could resubmit a full request including the information that the OGN requested and the process would continue. After discussions with PRAG, further information was sent to Bayside Council as requested and this information was bundled together with Councils further information and a revised request was sent back to the OGN in September.

In May 2020, after multiple requests for updates to the process which was expected to take up to 18 months or more, it was discovered that a communications breakdown had occurred between Bayside Council and the OGN that neither body was aware of and as such the name change process had stalled. It was discovered that a change had occurred in the lodgement system that meant that documentation sent by Council to the OGN had not been received and the OGN had believed the council was still looking to lodge it. Once this issue was detected, Bayside Council re-lodged all of the revised documentation via the requested communications channel on Friday 15 May 2020

As of August 2020, the OGN has advised that Bayside City Council's initial request for a change of locality name to "Pennydale" failed to provide a strong rationale for the proposed change. Furthermore, Bayside City Council did not respond to the OGN's questions regarding the proposal. The OGN also reported that in mid 2020, Council re-initiated the name change. The OGN sought a meeting with the Council CEO and Council Governance. The outcome of the meeting was the proposal was again declined, on the basis that Council did not adequately respond to the OGN's concerns raised in 2018.

In 2021 following further communications, Bayside Council continued its process with the Office of Geographic Names and returned to the Pennydale community with an update that it was still OK to proceed with the Neighbourhood Naming process (as opposed to the Suburb naming process) and requested advice as to if that was what the community wanted and they were advised yes to the question and Bayside resumed the dialogue with the OGN.

In May 2022 Bayside council received its advice back from the OGN and advised the Pennydale Residents Action Group that they would soon be delivering a letter to all residences in the Pennydale area recommending that Council move forward with the Neighbourhood naming process giving residents time to ask questions of Council. On June 2nd and 3rd Council hand delivered those letters to the community confirming that at it was Council's intention to move forward with the Neighbourhood naming process and advising locations of where signage on the streets would likely be erected as well as advising that the local strip shop on Bay Road currently named "Bay Road East Shopping Centre" would be renamed to "Pennydale Shopping Centre" and time was given to anyone with questions on the process to contact Council prior to taking the process to the Council meeting.

On Tuesday July 19th 2022 the Pennydale Neighbourhood naming process was taken to the Bayside Council meeting. After a request to be heard by the PRAG President thanking Council and the community for their support was read, Councillors then voted on the item and a division was called in which all 7 Councillors voted in favour or moving forward and allowing the Neighbourhood naming process to proceed. Council will complete all appropriate documentation and send to the Office of Geographic Names for final approvals and Gazettal which should take approximately 1 month. 

On September 1st 2022 the State Government Gazetted the Neighbourhood Name "Pennydale" as part of the Victorian Government Gazette G35 Pages 3659 - 3660 Change Registration request number 107100 officially creating the Neighbourhood of Pennydale, bounded by Bay road, Both sides of Jack Road, Park Road and the Frankston Railway line.

The Pennydale Structure Plan
Early in 2017, Bayside Council decided to develop the Southland Structure Plan, which included the Pennydale area. Residents of that area were concerned that the name would not only be confusing, but diminish participation due to the belief it had nothing to do with them. They persuaded Council to change the name to the Southland / Pennydale Structure Plan to better reflect its purpose. Council hired "Deliberately Engaging" to recruit 40 people to form a "Cheltenham / Pennydale Advisory Group", to give input into the plan. 20 people were recruited by email requests to residents. The other 20 were chosen from the community directly, to ensure an appropriate mix of sexes, ages and socio-economic status. The group met seven times, including an additional meeting requested by the members to look at the draft plan before it was made public.

On 11 October 2017, members of the Advisory Group were shown the first draft of a basic plan. Despite their opposition to the document, they were asked not to say anything until community consultation meetings on 21 October and 25 October. At the first consultation meeting, three options were put: Option 1 was no change, Option 2 allowed for buildings of up to four storeys, and Option 3 allowed for seven-storey buildings. The reaction was so negative that the Council decided to delete Option 3.

On 5 March 2018, Council released the Draft Structure Plan for consultation until 8 April. Three drop-in sessions were run, and residents affected were mailed a brochure advising them of the process and how to make their views known. At the final meeting of the Advisory Group, it was revealed that 82% of respondents wanted the boundary of the Southland Major Activity Centre to remain along the Frankston railway line. 82% did not want apartment buildings in the Bay Road, Park Road or Tulip Grove areas. 68% did not want a new crossing on Bay road under the rail bridge. 68% said no to opening a Tulip Grove entrance to Southland railway station. 80% wanted a shared user path along the railway line. 77% wanted a bike path along the south side of Park Road. 69% did not want a bike path along Bay Road. 68% said no to a bike path along Jack road. 82% wanted all developments to include the required amount of car parking. 85% said they wanted lane problem on Bay Road fixed. 61% did not want traffic lights on the corner of Jack Road and Park Road, but 63% wanted traffic lights on the corner of Jack road and Bay road. 87% wanted to maintain the "leafy" character of streets through planting and landscaping.

Three options were then proposed by Council officers: 1) Abandoning the structure plan altogether (Councils best option); 2)Keeping the structure plan with the boundary of the Southland Major Activity Centre covering all of Pennydale and making minor changes, listing that option as not acceptable to residents; and 3) Keeping the structure plan with the boundary of the Southland Major Activity Centre to stay along the railway line although making minor changes, also listing that as unacceptable to residents. Against the advice of council officers, the Advisory Group added a fourth option, being to continue with the Structure Plan but leaving the boundary along the railway line and making major changes to the draft plan.

Using the results of the survey, the Advisory Group developed a document to be given to the council to be used to make a decision about whether to proceed with the structure plan or not, which was to be made by Council prior its August meeting.

In June 2018, council officers announced they were releasing a final draft of the Structure Plan to be voted on at the June Council meeting. Many Pennydale residents were concerned that their views were not reflected in the document, although Council agreed to kept Pennydale out of major activity centre along the Frankston railway line. Council did decide that the plan would be renamed the Pennydale Structure Plan, but that more work needed to be done, and a final vote was delayed until the August Council meeting.

Members of PRAG met members of the council team responsible for the Structure plan several times and corresponded by email. PRAG was pleased that the Council officers wanted to ensure that every one was happy with the final version. By the end of the process, it was felt that the majority of residents would accept the outcome. On 31 August, Council released the final version of the draft, with a two-week consultation period.

In October 2018 Council resolved to adopt the Pennydale Structure Plan and commence the Planning Scheme Amendments. Council adopted the final version of the structure plan after it was updated with additional suggestions from the community. The Bayside Council adopted Pennydale Structure Plan can be found here. This page also contains a copy of the changes made to the original version and a copy of the minutes of the meetings between Bayside Council and PRAG.

On 3 January 2019, Bayside Council submitted the Pennydale Structure Plan (Bayside Planning Scheme Amendment C163) to the Department of Land, Water, Environment and Planning (DELWP) and began awaiting authorisation to commence exhibition of the amendment to the public. This process can take quite a lot of time depending upon the work load of the Government Department and the complexity of the Structure Plan to be looked at. As at June 2020, there has been no response to the Amendment C163 lodgement by Bayside Council, however the Minister has responded to a number of other Bayside Planning Scheme Amendments including Amendment C151 Hampton East Structure Plan, Amendment C152 Martin Street Structure Plan and amendment C162 Highett Structure Plan.

On 30 April 2020, The Department of Environment, Land, Water & Planning (DELWP) wrote to Bayside Council advising that they had refused authorisation of Amendment C163. The reasons for refusal were given as:

- The proposed amendment would not suitably implement the relevant sections of Plan Melbourne 2017–2050, the Bayside Housing Strategy 2012 and the Planning Policy Framework as the amendment does not adequately focus growth in an area close to jobs,
services and transport or respond to the strategic and physical context of the area; and
- Modelling of the ResCode variations proposed by the new zones (GRZ 9,10 and 11) shows that the development potential of the majority of lots affected by the amendment will be limited to two-storeys which limits the potential for development to achieve a three-storey built form.

The response also contained 3 options for Bayside Council to follow:
- Abandon the Structure Plan in its entirety;
- Review the Structure Plan; or
- Not include the Structure Plan in the Planning Scheme, but retain the Structure Plan as an
adopted Council document.

Council wrote to the Pennydale Community and those registered showing interest on 8 July 2020 advising them of this decision from DELWP and advised that Council would consider the options for managing the growth and future development of the Pennydale area and would decide upon the option at its upcoming 18 August 2020 Ordinary Council Meeting.

On 28 July 2020 at the Bayside Council's Ordinary Council Meeting, a petition from 25 Bayside residents calling for the Pennydale Structure Plan to be abandoned and that in its place a new "Cheltenham-Southland (Bayside) Structure Plan" be implemented "in conformity with Plan Melbourne 2017-2050, the Bayside Housing Strategy and the Bayside Planning Scheme objectives, and community requirements for safe, convenient and sustainable access to Activity Centres and public transport", and that "The CSBSP would replace the Pennydale plan rejected by Department of Environment, Land, Water and Planning (DELWP) 30 April 2020". The petition sought to request that Bayside Council commence immediately to develop a new structure plan reflecting the majority of community views; a well planned increase in residential density; commence work on a Shared User Path (SUP) from Cheltenham to Sandringham starting along Park Road by requesting the Minister for Transport to instruct the LXRP to begin the initial construct; request the Minister for Transport to instruct the LXRP to extend the SUP from Heather Grove to Southland with a bridge over Bay Road and to have this work added into the current LXRP works and have this commenced right away; and to request the Minister of Transport to instruct the LXRP to extend the path adjacent to Heather Grove North with a ramp to the Southern end of Platform 1 with drop off point for seniors people with disabilities and families to get to and from Southland station. The Council Officer's recommendation was that this petition be dealt with in conjunction with a report to be presented at the 18 August 2020 Ordinary Council Meeting regarding the Pennydale Structure Plan.

On 18 August 2020 at the Bayside Council Ordinary Meeting, the Council officers presented their report explaining all of the options put to them by DELWP showing pros and cons of all 3 options and then recommended that the Pennydale Structure Plan be abandoned and to write to the residents of Pennydale to advise them of the decision. Further, it was determined that the officers prepare a report into the feasibility of the items bought up in the Petition tabled at the 28 July 2020 Ordinary Council Meeting to be tabled at the 15 December 2020 Ordinary Council Meeting, and, to investigate the feasibility of implementation of a number of aspects of the now abandoned Pennydale Structure Plan that can still be achieved directly via implementation from Council, also to be presented at the 5 December 2020 Ordinary Council meeting. The vote by all Councillors was unanimous.

Education
Olympic Avenue Kindergarten is located in Olympic Avenue Pennydale, adjacent to Pennydale Park. The Kinder was originally opened in 1955 as the Olympic Avenue Play Centre after being designed by renowned architect Rex Patrick and built by the local parents, with two builders and Patrick on the Committee, before transitioning to a Kindergarten in 1958 and continues to operate as a Kindergarten to this day.

Transport
Pennydale lies between Southland railway station and Cheltenham railway station on the Frankston railway line. On 26 November 2017, Southland railway station opened just south of Bay Road, immediately adjacent to the Westfield Southland Shopping Centre car park. As part of the construction of the station, an entrance was provided that can open to Tulip Grove. However, when surveyed by Public Transport Victoria (PTV), 89% of residents said they did not want that entrance opened. At a subsequent meeting held between a number of residents, Murray Thompson, the then member for Sandringham, PTV, and the Public Transport Minister, it was agreed that the entrance should remain closed unless the number of passengers warranted opening it. Bayside Council confirmed that it did not want that station entrance to open. In 2015 as part of the Level Crossings Removal Project (LXRP) it was announced that the Level Crossings at Cheltenham and Mentone were to be removed. Residents began the involvement with the project to attempt to ensure that these were not replaced with Skyrail bridges but lowered into a trench. In June 2016 preliminary reports for other stations along the Frankston line showed that some stations would be put onto a Skyrail bridge and as such the residents doubled don to try to make Cheltenham go into a trench. Many residents took part in online and on location consultations and on 1 February 2017 the LXRP announced that Cheltenham Station would be lowered into a trench and that both Park Road and Charman Road Level Crossings would be removed. In February 2019 the initial works began to prepare for the removal of the level crossings and the construction of the new Cheltenham Railway Station in a trench. On 15 May 2019 the LXRP released a document stating "As part of the removal of three level crossings in Cheltenham and Mentone, the Level Crossing Removal Project will protect and preserve the existing heritage station buildings. Mentone Station and gardens are listed on the Victorian Heritage Register. The Cheltenham Station buildings have local heritage protection. We have engaged independent experts who specialise in heritage assessments to help us as we have developed the designs for removing the level crossings at Park Road and Charman Road in Cheltenham and Balcombe Road in Mentone. We will carefully relocate the timber station buildings at Mentone and Cheltenham away from the work sites and refurbish them. The Mentone Station buildings will be returned to their existing locations, with a new 'heritage bridge' across the rail line between the buildings. The final location of the Cheltenham Station buildings is yet to be determined, and we will work with the local community during this process.". Major works commenced on the Level Crossing Removal in September 2019 with the new station in the trench opened on August 16th 2020 with works still to be done on the multi-story carpark which opened a few months later.

Pennydale is also served by a number of bus routes including Route 828 (Hampton to Berwick Station via Southland Shopping Centre and Dandenong) along Bay Road, and Route 822 (Chadstone Shopping Centre to Sandringham via Murrumbeena and Southland Shopping Centre) along Jack Road and Park Road.

In 2018 the Labor State Government announced the Suburban Rail Loop project with the first stage starting at Sir William Fry Reserve in Highett (they say Cheltenham) and finishing in Box Hill. This first stage is due to be opened in 2035 and would mean a 3rd station servicing the Pennydale area.

Parks
There are two parks located in Pennydale:
 Pennydale Park
 Tulip Grove Park

See also
 Cheltenham, Victoria
 Cheltenham railway station 
 City of Bayside
 Southland railway station
 Westfield Southland

References

Localities of Melbourne
Cheltenham, Victoria